José Pedro Aguiar Branco (born 18 July 1957) is a Portuguese politician. He was the nation's Minister of National Defense from 2011 to 2015. He also served as Minister of Justice from 2004 to 2005.

References

Government ministers of Portugal
Justice ministers of Portugal
Ministers of National Defence of Portugal
1957 births
Living people
20th-century Portuguese lawyers
People from Porto